Jamie Demetriou (born November 1987) is an English comedian, actor and screenwriter. He is best known for his role as Bus Rodent in Fleabag and for creating, co-writing, and starring in Stath Lets Flats. For the latter, he won Best Male Actor in a Comedy, Best Writer of a Comedy, and Best Scripted Comedy at the 2020 BAFTA Awards.

Early life
Demetriou was born in the Friern Barnet area of London the son of an English mother and Greek-Cypriot father. His elder sister, Natasia Demetriou, is a comedian and actress with whom he often collaborates. He attended The Compton School in North Finchley and joined the Chickenshed Theatre in Southgate, then attended Bristol University.

Career
Demetriou's student revue show Bristol Revunions received critical acclaim at the Edinburgh Fringe Festival from 2009 to 2011. His one-man multi-character show People Day later drew a comparison with Steve Coogan in The Independent.

Comedic television acting credits include Scrotal Recall, Drunk History, Tracey Ullman's Show, Fleabag, and Channel 4 sitcom Stath Lets Flats in which he stars with his sister Natasia Demetriou. Stath Lets Flats was also written by Jamie (with the first three episodes co-written by Look Around You and Friday Night Dinner creator Robert Popper) and also stars Katy Wix and Dustin Demri-Burns. In 2019, Demetriou was nominated for two BAFTA Awards for Stath Lets Flats – Best Male Performance in a Comedy Programme and Best Scripted Comedy (as producer). In 2020, he won a hat-trick of BAFTAs – Best Writer: Comedy, Male Performance in a Comedy Programme, and Best Scripted Comedy (as producer).

He has appeared on several podcasts including: Scroobius Pip's Distraction Pieces Podcast; the Brian Gittins; Friends podcast; Off Menu with Ed Gamble and James Acaster; and Richard Herring's RHLSTP, as well as BBC Radio 4 Show Fresh From the Fringe.

Demetriou also appeared in Paddington 2 as The Professor.

Demetriou voiced Moriarty in the 2018 computer animated film Sherlock Gnomes, opposite Johnny Depp as the eponymous detective, and appeared in the music video for "Nightmares" by Easy Life.

In 2019, he appeared as celebrity chef Ralphy Moore in an episode of This Time with Alan Partridge, causing Alan to have a major allergic reaction by accidentally serving him oysters. He also provided the voice of a phone-in caller in another episode. That same year he appeared in sister Natasia's comedy sketch show pilot Ellie & Natasia and played Marcus in the American miniseries Four Weddings and a Funeral, an adaption of the 1994 British film of the same name.

He performed stand-up in character as Andy on Harry Hill's Clubnite in November 2019.

In 2020, he appeared in The Great alongside Elle Fanning, the comedy TV series Miracle Workers, and played a small role in Eurovision Song Contest: The Story of Fire Saga.

In 2021 he has appeared in Disney's Cruella and in the biographical film The Electrical Life of Louis Wain. 

In 2022, he was in the main cast of the Chris Miller show The Afterparty on Apple TV+, and voiced the angel Fingers on the Netflix show Dead End: Paranormal Park.

Filmography

Film

Television

References

External links
 

20th-century births
Alumni of the University of Bristol
Best Male Comedy Performance BAFTA Award (television) winners
British male comedy actors
British male comedians
British male film actors
British male screenwriters
British male television actors
British male voice actors
English people of Greek Cypriot descent
Comedians from London
Male actors from London
Living people
Year of birth missing (living people)